Lincoln Fernando Rocha da Silva (born 7 March 1996), commonly known as Lincoln, is a Brazilian footballer who currently plays as a defender.

Career statistics

Club

Notes

References

1996 births
Living people
Footballers from Rio de Janeiro (city)
Brazilian footballers
Association football defenders
Segunda División B players
CF Lorca Deportiva players
Campeonato Brasileiro Série C players
CR Flamengo footballers
Tombense Futebol Clube players
Barretos Esporte Clube players
Brazilian expatriate footballers
Brazilian expatriate sportspeople in Spain
Expatriate footballers in Spain
Brazil youth international footballers